The following is a list of covered bridges in Lancaster County, Pennsylvania USA.  Lancaster County has the most covered bridges in Pennsylvania with 28 covered bridges. Parke County, Indiana has the most covered bridges of any county in the United States with 31 covered bridges  All of the covered bridges in Lancaster County, except for the Hunsecker's Mill Covered Bridge, Kurtz's Mill Covered Bridge, and the Willow Hill Covered Bridge, are listed on the National Register of Historic Places.  Most have been on the list since 1980.  The WGCB numbering prefix for the county is 38-36

The bridges are an important tourist attraction, both economically and culturally.  This is due to both their historical significance and, being in the heart of Pennsylvania Dutch country, the frequent, iconic Amish horse and buggies bridge crossings. They are often visited in the form of covered bridge driving tours.

History 
In the early to late 1800s there were approximately 1,500 covered bridges in the state of Pennsylvania.  That number has decreased to just over 200 bridges, with more located in Lancaster County than any other county in the state.  The remaining covered bridges in the county are a remnant of a time where most bridges in the United States were made from wood, since wood was relatively inexpensive and easy to acquire.  Bridge making, however, was anything but easy and required significant cost, effort, and time.  The cost of the building the bridges was covered by government funds or by private individuals building bridges across their land.  Since the bridges were built from wood, they were covered to provide protection from the weather, dramatically extending the life of the bridges.  Nevertheless, as floods and fires destroyed more bridges, they were eventually replaced or bypassed with more durable and longer-lasting reinforced concrete and steel beam bridges. Most of the existing bridges are owned by the county government which is responsible for periodic upkeep and maintenance.

Modern status 
Throughout the years, many of the existing covered bridges have been destroyed, but were later reconstructed.  For example, in 1972 a number of the county's covered bridges were either destroyed or badly damaged as a result of flooding caused by Hurricane Agnes.  Notably, the Zook's Mill Covered Bridge managed to survive despite being filled with a few feet of water.  The Willow Hill Covered Bridge, a relatively new bridge built in 1962, is a reconstructed bridge using materials recovered from the old Miller's Farm and Good's Fording covered bridges.

Design 
The covered bridges in Lancaster County are all built of similar construction and appearance.  Some of this is because many of the existing bridges were built by the same man, Elias McMellen, who built 12 of the existing bridges.  The most common construction method used was that of the Burr arch truss.  It is found in its single and double span forms in almost all of the covered bridges in the county, except for the Landis Mill Covered Bridge, a multiple kingpost design.  The Pine Grove Covered Bridge and Herr's Mill Covered Bridge (now gone) are the county's only double span covered bridges.  While most of the bridges are situated in remote locations where there is limited traffic, a number of the bridges, such as Jackson's Sawmill Covered Bridge, were later reinforced with steel beams underneath the bridge floor and steel hanger rods on the sides to support heavier traffic or give the bridge additional support.

Historically, the Lancaster County covered bridges were painted with red sides and all-white portals.  Today most of the bridges retain this pattern, however, some of the portals are painted red with white trim (such as on the Zook's Mill Covered Bridge) or all-red (such as on the Pool Forge Covered Bridge).  A number of these bridges also have the side panels painted red on the inside of the bridge while leaving the trusses unpainted.  The Keller's Mill Covered Bridge is painted all-white, the only one of its kind in the county.  Three of the bridges, Buck Hill Covered Bridge, Schenck's Mill Covered Bridge, and Shearer's Covered Bridge, have horizontal side boards.  The rest of the bridges have vertical side boards.

Existing bridges

Former bridges 
Bellbank Covered Bridge† (burnt in 1979)
Daniel Good's Fording Covered Bridge (Used to make Willow Hill Covered Bridge in 1962)
Miller's Farm Covered Bridge (Used to make Willow Hill Covered Bridge in 1962)
Pennsylvania Railroad Bridge‡ - Created in the 1820s, burnt during the American civil war in July 1863.  It was the longest covered bridge in the world (over a mile and a quarter in length).
Risser's Mill Covered Bridge (burnt on July 8, 2002)

†Located on the border between Lancaster County and Chester County

‡Located on the border between Lancaster County and York County

See also 
 List of covered bridges in Columbia County, Pennsylvania
 List of covered bridges of Bradford, Sullivan and Lycoming Counties

References 

Pennsylvania
Covered bridges in Lancaster County
Bridges, covered, Lancaster County